Media Chinese International Limited is a Chinese language media platform targeting Chinese readers in major Chinese communities worldwide headquartered in Hong Kong. Tan Sri Datuk Tiong Hiew King is the chairman. It was formed by the merger of Ming Pao Enterprise (Hong Kong), Sin Chew Media Corporation (Malaysia) and Nanyang Press Holdings (Malaysia) in April 2008. It is the first entity dually listed on the mainboards of The Stock Exchange of Hong Kong and the Bursa Malaysia. Media Chinese's product portfolio comprises 5 daily newspapers in 13 editions and 3 free newspapers with a total daily circulation of about 1 million copies, as well as about 30 magazines. The Group has also expanded its business into digital media. Media Chinese is the proprietor of Life Magazines, the largest Chinese language magazine publisher in Malaysia, and is the major shareholder of One Media Group Limited (listed on The Stock Exchange of Hong Kong Limited; stock code: 426).

Its head office is in the Ming Pao Industrial Centre in Chai Wan.

Key milestones
1923 - Nanyang Siang Pau was launched in Malaysia
1929 - Sin Chew Daily was launched in Malaysia
1946 - China Press was launched in Malaysia
1959 - Ming Pao Daily News launched in Hong Kong
1968 - Ming Pao Weekly was launched in Hong Kong
1987 - Guang Ming Daily was launched in Malaysia
1988 - Sin Chew Media Corporation taken over by Tiong Hiew King
1989 - Nanyang Press Holdings was listed on the mainboard of Bursa Malaysia
1991 - Ming Pao Enterprise Corporation was listed on the mainboard of The Stock Exchange of Hong Kong
1993 - Ming Pao Daily News expanded to Vancouver and Toronto
1995 - Ming Pao Enterprise Corporation was taken over by Tiong Hiew King
1997 - Ming Pao Daily News expanded to New York
2000 - Yahoo! took equity stake in mingpao.com
2004 - Ming Pao Daily News expanded to San Francisco
2004 - One Media Group is formed to publish and operate its lifestyle magazines in the Greater China region
2004 - Sin Chew Media Corporation was listed on the mainboard of Bursa Malaysia
2005 - Ming Pao Enterprise Corporation spun off One Media Group; which was successfully listed on The Stock Exchange of Hong Kong
2007 - Ming Pao Enterprise Corporation entered into a merger agreement with Sin Chew Media and Nanyang Press Holdings
2008 - Ming Pao Enterprise Corporation completed the merger with Sin Chew Media Corporation and Nanyang Press Holdings to create Media Chinese International
2008 - Media Chinese International was dual listed on The Stock Exchange of Hong Kong and Bursa Malaysia
2009 - Ming Pao Daily News New York Edition merged with its free daily to become Ming Pao (NY) Free Daily
2009 - Ming Pao Daily News San Francisco Edition ceased its publication
2009 - Media Chinese established a partnership with IATOPIA.COM in e-publication technologies and content management system
2009 - Media Chinese tapped China's mobile reading market through an investment in ByRead
2015 - LogOn ecommerce marketplace launched in Malaysia.

Vision and business direction 

The major corporate value of Media Chinese is "Global Affairs．Chinese Perspective", which is to present a comprehensive yet objective in Chinese perspective on global issues to the Chinese communities around the world. As one of the key global Chinese-language media operators, a four-pronged strategy has been set to achieve the objective of "from local to global" and "from print to multimedia". Firstly, Media Chinese will continue to capture the organic growth in the home markets by further developing and improving the existing products. Secondly, the Group will continue to implement and integrate local operations especially in Malaysia, and to better exploit synergistic benefits by unlocking growth potentials of the existing content assets. Thirdly, the Group will embark on the full capabilities in bringing foreign contents into China and exporting established home-grown contents to other Chinese speaking communities. And fourthly, the Group will actively develop and expand the multimedia content deliveries via non-print channels.

Key publications 
Media Chinese has 5 well-established Chinese language newspapers.

Ming Pao (Chinese: 明報)
Launched on 20 May 1959, Ming Pao Daily News reports and analyzes economic, political and social events in the world. Editions are available in Hong Kong, Toronto, Vancouver, New York City and San Francisco. Ming Pao Daily News is one of the most influential and credible newspapers in Hong Kong.

Sin Chew Daily (Chinese: 星洲日報)
Launched on 15 January 1929, Sin Chew Daily ranks the first in terms of circulation and readership in Peninsular Malaysia. It is also the largest Chinese language newspaper in Southeast Asia in terms of circulation.

China Press (Chinese: 中國報)
Launched on 1 February 1946. On 19 May 1990, China Press launched evening paper and it holds the largest market share in evening paper market.

Guang Ming Daily (Chinese: 光明日報)
Launched on 18 December 1987, Guang Ming Daily is a leading Chinese language newspaper in the Northern region of Peninsula Malaysia. In 1994, its circulation network expanded to the whole Malaysia and it ranks the third in terms of circulation and readership in Peninsula Malaysia.

Nanyang Siang Pau (Chinese: 南洋商報)
Launched on 6 September 1923, Nanyang Siang Pau is the one of the oldest Chinese daily in Malaysia. It is also one of the largest Chinese dailies which ranks the fourth in terms of circulation and readership in Peninsular Malaysia.

Other publications 
Media Chinese has over 30 magazine titles comprising categories of entertainment and lifestyle, technology, children and automotive.

 Hong Kong publications
Yazhou Zhoukan (Chinese: 亞洲周刊) - published weekly, and is the world's only Chinese language international affairs magazine

Ming Pao Weekly (Chinese: 明報周刊) - published weekly, and is a premium lifestyles and entertainment magazines in Hong Kong

TopGear (HK edition) (Chinese: 極速誌) - magazine mixture of entertainment and car-buying information

 Mainland China publications

Popular Science (Chinese: 科技新時代) - it leads the field of science and technology publish in Mainland China

TopGear (China edition) (Chinese: 汽車測試報告) - showcase for the finest and enthralling automobiles

 Malaysian publications
Bintang Sin Chew (Chinese: 小星星周刊) - is a national full-color children's weekly in Malaysia

Sinaran Sin Chew (Chinese: 星星周刊) - published weekly, is a student publication recommended by the Ministry of Education

Cahaya Sin Chew (Chinese: 學海周刊) - it conducts campaign to encourage secondary school students to take Chinese exams

There are another 21 magazine titles published under the Life Magazines, which is a member of the Nanyang Press Group. They include Feminine (Chinese: 風采), New Tide (Chinese: 新潮), Oriental Cuisine (Chinese: 美味風采), New Icon for Him (Chinese: 時尚男人), Long Life (Chinese: 大家健康), etc.

Other businesses
Ming Pao Publications - specializes in politics, economy, history and literature publications and book series

Ming Man Publications - channel to publish the works of aspiring and talented authors

Charming Holidays & Delta Tour - travel agency in Hong Kong and with business spans across North America

Kin Ming Printing - based in Hong Kong and Guangzhou, China

Websites
Media Chinese's product has various online portals across key cities in North America, Southeast Asia and Greater China.
 mingpao.com
 sinchew.com.my
 nanyang.com
 logon.my Online Shopping

See also
 Newspapers of Hong Kong
 Media in Hong Kong

References

External links 
 Media Chinese
 Ming Pao
 China Press
 Yazhou Zhoukan
 Sin Chew Daily
 LogOn Online Shopping Malaysia 
 Guang Ming Daily 
 Nanyang Siang Pau
 Ming Pao Weekly
 TopGear
 Popular Science
 Charming Holidays

2008 establishments in Hong Kong
Companies listed on the Hong Kong Stock Exchange
Newspaper companies of Hong Kong
Newspaper companies of Malaysia
Companies listed on Bursa Malaysia